Robert Darch (born 1979) is a British artist-photographer. His first book, The Moor, was published in 2018.

Life and work
Darch was born in Birmingham and grew up in Droitwich Spa. He studied Documentary Photography at University of Wales, Newport, graduating in 2004. He returned to study photography at Plymouth University in 2013 after a long period of illness, gaining a Masters in Photography & The Book and an MFA in Photographic Arts.

Darch's work was included in the book, Another Country: British Documentary Photography Since 1945, by Gerry Badger and published by Thames & Hudson.

Darch resides in Devon, England, where he located the fictional town of Durlescombe, the setting for an on-going series exploring his familial attachment to this specific region of England.

The Moor (2018), depicts a fictionalised dystopian future situated on the bleak moorland landscapes of Dartmoor, Devon.

Vale (2020), reflects on a long period of ill health Robert Darch suffered in his twenties and the isolation and loneliness he experienced because of that. Whilst he was ill Robert would get lost in daydream and fiction, creating imaginary worlds to temper the isolation and sadness. Vale reflects on this lost time and imagines a fictional summer spent swimming in rivers and exploring woods, underscored by a sustained sense of eeriness.

Publications

Publications by Darch
The Moor. Another Place, 2018. . Edition of 500 copies.
Vale. LIDO, 2020. . Edition of 750 copies.

Publications with contributions by Darch
Portrait of Britain Vol 1. London: Hoxton Mini Press, 2018. .
Portrait of Britain Vol 2. London: Hoxton Mini Press, 2019. .
Portrait of Britain Vol 3. London: Hoxton Mini Press, 2020. .
Facing Britain. Germany: Walther & Franz König, 2021. .
Portrait of Britain Vol 4. London: Hoxton Mini Press, 2021. .
Another Country: British Documentary Photography Since 1945. London: Thames & Hudson, 2022. .

Awards
2016: Portrait Salon, for "Boys on the Estuary"
2017: Winner, single image in Life category, Renaissance Photography Prize
2018: Portrait of Britain, British Journal of Photography
2019: Portrait of Britain, British Journal of Photography
2021: Portrait of Britain, British Journal of Photography

Selected solo exhibitions

Durlescombe, Kunsthalle Darmstadt , Darmstadt, Germany, April 2022.

Selected group exhibitions

Distinctly, Pingyao International Photography Festival, Pingyao, China, September 2018. Work by Darch and Martin Parr, Chris Killip, Daniel Meadows, John Myers, Markéta Luskačová, Tish Murtha, Ken Grant, Paul Seawright, Niall McDiarmid, Elaine Constantine, and Kirsty Mackay.
Distinctly, Look Photo Biennal, Liverpool, U.K., September 2019. Work by Darch and Martin Parr, Chris Killip, Daniel Meadows, John Myers, Markéta Luskačová, Tish Murtha, Ken Grant, Niall McDiarmid and Kirsty Mackay.
Facing Britain, Museum Goch, Germany, October 2020. Work by Darch and John Bulmer, Rob Bremner, Thom Corbishley, Anna Fox, Ken Grant, Judy Greenway, Mohamed Hassan, Paul Hill, David Hurn, Barry Lewis, Markéta Luskačová, Kirsty Mackay, Niall McDiarmid, Daniel Meadows, Peter Mitchell, Tish Murtha, John Myers, Jon Nicholson, Kevin O'Farrell, Niall McDiarmid, Martin Parr, Mark Pinder, Paul Reas, Simon Roberts, Syd Shelton, Dave Sinclair, Homer Sykes and Jon Tonks.
Turn to Return, Bristol Photo Festival, Bristol, U.K. September 2021. Work by Darch and Helen Sear.
Facing Britain, Kunsthalle Darmstadt, Darmstadt, Germany, September 2021. 
Facing Britain, Mönchehaus Museum Goslar, Goslar, Germany, February 2022. 
Facing Britain, Museum for Photography Krakow, Krakow, Poland, June 2022.

References

External links 

Photographers from Devon
Documentary photographers
Alumni of the University of Wales, Newport
1979 births
Living people
21st-century British photographers
Alumni of the University of Plymouth